Lyuksemburg is a village in Chüy Region of Kyrgyzstan. It is part of the Ysyk-Ata District. Its population was 5,528 in 2021. It lies adjacent to the west of the city Kant, and 17 km east of Bishkek.

Population

References

Populated places in Chüy Region